Web Application Distribution Infrastructure is an open-source a Java EE container plugin that provides transparent high availability Java EE services.

References

External links

Web Hosting

Apache Software Foundation projects
Java enterprise platform